Rajasthan, a state in western India, has had a close historical connection with Jainism. Southwestern Rajasthan was the main centre for Svetambara Jainism. Major Digambara centres are in the northern and eastern parts of Rajasthan. Central and Northern Rajasthan are the main centres for the Terapanth sect of Svetambara Jainism.

Major centres

Major ancient Jain centres include:
 Soniji Ki Nasiyan (Ajmer Jain Temple)
 Khandela
 Bhinmal
 Osian, Jodhpur; Mahavira Jain temple, Osian
 Muchhal Mahavir Temple
 Nagaur
 Amer (Jaipur)
 Sanganer
 Kesariyaji Tirth, Rishabhdeo
 Shri Mahaveerji temple
 Padampura
 Lodhurva Jain temple
 Nakodaji
 Dilwara Temples, Mount Abu
 Jirawala
 Ranakpur
 Bijolia
 Nareli Jain Temple
 Pindwara
 Chittorgarh
 Bhandasar Jain Temple
 Chand Khedi
 Shree Pavapuri Tirth Dham
 Jaisalmer Fort Jain temples
 Mungathala
 Chamatkarji

Photo gallery

See also

Tijara Jain Temple
Shri Mahavirji Jain Temple

References
 Dr. Jagdish Chandra Jain, History of Towns of Rajasthan

External links 
 Jain heritage centers -Rajasthan

Jainism in India
Jain communities
Religion in Rajasthan
History of Rajasthan